The 1967 Maryland Terrapins football team represented the University of Maryland in the 1967 NCAA University Division football season. In their first season under head coach Bob Ward, the Terrapins compiled a 0–9 record (0–6 in conference), finished in last place in the Atlantic Coast Conference, and were outscored by their opponents 231 to 46. The team's statistical leaders included Chuck Drimal with 669 passing yards, Billy Lovett with 499 rushing yards, and Rick Carlson with 309 receiving yards.

Schedule

Roster

References

Maryland
Maryland Terrapins football seasons
College football winless seasons
Maryland Terrapins football